Melanorivulus is a genus of South American freshwater fish in the family Rivulidae. Most species are endemic to the Río de la Plata, eastern Amazon (west to Tapajós basin), Tocantins–Araguaia and São Francisco basins in Brazil, but a few members of this genus range west into Bolivia, south into Paraguay and Argentina, and east to Parnaíba and Sergipe in northeastern Brazil. Only M. schuncki occurs north of the Amazon River. Many have tiny ranges and are seriously threatened.

Similar to closely related genera such as Anablepsoides, Atlantirivulus, Cynodonichthys and Laimosemion, Melanorivulus are jumpers and non-annual killifish.

They are often quite colorful and some are kept in aquariums.

Species
Until 2011, Melanorivulus were included in Rivulus, and some prefer to maintain them in that genus.

If recognized as a valid genus, there are currently 60 species in Melanorivulus:

 Melanorivulus amambaiensis Volcan, Severo-Neto & Lanés, 2018
 Melanorivulus apiamici (W. J. E. M. Costa, 1989)
 Melanorivulus atlanticus W. J. E. M. Costa, Bragança & Ottoni, 2015
 Melanorivulus bororo (W. J. E. M. Costa, 2008)
 Melanorivulus britzkei Nielsen, 2017
 Melanorivulus canesi Nielsen, 2017
 Melanorivulus crixas (W. J. E. M. Costa, 2007)
 Melanorivulus cyanopterus (W. J. E. M. Costa, 2005)
 Melanorivulus dapazi (W. J. E. M. Costa, 2005)
 Melanorivulus decoratus (W. J. E. M. Costa, 1989)
 Melanorivulus egens (W. J. E. M. Costa, 2005)
 Melanorivulus faucireticulatus (W. J. E. M. Costa, 2008)
 Melanorivulus flavipinnis W. J. E. M. Costa, 2017
 Melanorivulus formosensis (W. J. E. M. Costa, 2008)
 Melanorivulus giarettai (W. J. E. M. Costa, 2008)
 Melanorivulus ignescens W. J. E. M. Costa, 2017
 Melanorivulus illuminatus (W. J. E. M. Costa, 2007)
 Melanorivulus imperatrizensis D. T. B. Nielsen & C. S. Pinto, 2015
 Melanorivulus interruptus Volcan, Severo-Neto & Lanés, 2018
 Melanorivulus ivinhemensis Volcan, Severo-Neto & Lanés, 2018
 Melanorivulus jalapensis (W. J. E. M. Costa, 2010)
 Melanorivulus javahe (W. J. E. M. Costa, 2007)
 Melanorivulus karaja (W. J. E. M. Costa, 2007)
 Melanorivulus kayabi (W. J. E. M. Costa, 2008)
 Melanorivulus kayapo (W. J. E. M. Costa, 2006)
 Melanorivulus kunzei W. J. E. M. Costa, 2012
 Melanorivulus leali W. J. E. M. Costa, 2013 
 Melanorivulus linearis W. J. E. M. Costa, 2018
 Melanorivulus litteratus (W. J. E. M. Costa, 2005)
 Melanorivulus megaroni (W. J. E. M. Costa, 2010)
 Melanorivulus modestus (W. J. E. M. Costa, 1991)
 Melanorivulus nelsoni Volcan, Severo-Neto & Lanés, 2017
 Melanorivulus nigromarginatus W. J. E. M. Costa, 2018
 Melanorivulus nigropunctatus Volcan, Klotzel & Lanés, 2017
 Melanorivulus ofaie Volcan, Klotzel & Lanés, 2017
 Melanorivulus paracatuensis (W. J. E. M. Costa, 2003)
 Melanorivulus paresi (W. J. E. M. Costa, 2008)
 Melanorivulus parnaibensis (W. J. E. M. Costa, 2003)
 Melanorivulus petrisecundi W. J. E. M. Costa, 2016
 Melanorivulus pictus (W. J. E. M. Costa, 1989)
 Melanorivulus pindorama W. J. E. M. Costa, 2012
 Melanorivulus pinima (W. J. E. M. Costa, 1989)
 Melanorivulus planaltinus (W. J. E. M. Costa & Brasil, 2008)
 Melanorivulus polychromus D. T. B. Nielsen, P. A. B. A. Neves, Ywamoto & Passos, 2016
 Melanorivulus proximus W. J. E. M. Costa, 2018
 Melanorivulus punctatus (Boulenger, 1895)
 Melanorivulus regularis W. J. E. M. Costa, 2017
 Melanorivulus rossoi (W. J. E. M. Costa, 2005)
 Melanorivulus rubromarginatus (W. J. E. M. Costa, 2007)
 Melanorivulus rubroreticulatus W. J. E. M. Costa, Amorim & Bragança, 2014
 Melanorivulus rutilicaudus (W. J. E. M. Costa, 2005)
 Melanorivulus salmonicaudus (W. J. E. M. Costa, 2007)
 Melanorivulus scalaris (W. J. E. M. Costa, 2005)
 Melanorivulus schuncki (W. J. E. M. Costa & de Luca, 2011)
 Melanorivulus spixi W. J. E. M. Costa, 2016
 Melanorivulus ubirajarai W. J. E. M. Costa, 2012 
 Melanorivulus violaceus (W. J. E. M. Costa, 1991)
 Melanorivulus vittatus (W. J. E. M. Costa, 1989)
 Melanorivulus wallacei W. J. E. M. Costa, 2016
 Melanorivulus zygonectes (G. S. Myers, 1927)

References

Rivulidae
Fish of South America
Freshwater fish genera